Karl Stotz (27 March 1927 – 4 April 2017) was an Austrian football player from Vienna.

As a young soldier, he fought in the Battle of Stalingrad, was captured in 1944 and only returned home in 1948.

Club career
On his return to his homeland, Stotz played three years for FC Wien before joining Austria Wien in 1951. In his 12 years with the Vienna giants he won 4 league titles and 2 domestic cups.

In 2001, he was chosen in Austria's Team of the Century.

International career
He made his debut for Austria in a March 1950 friendly match against Switzerland and was a participant at the 1954 FIFA World Cup and 1958 FIFA World Cup.  He earned 42 caps, scoring one goal. His final international was a September 1962 friendly match against Czechoslovakia.

Retirement
He later went into coaching and managed Austria Wien and the Austria national team whom he led to the 1982 FIFA World Cup but was sacked just before the tournament.

Stotz died on 4 April 2017 in Seefeld in Tirol, Austria, aged 90.

Honours
Austrian Football Bundesliga (4):
 1953, 1961, 1962, 1963
Austrian Cup (2):
 1960,1962

References

External links
Player profile - Austria Wien archive 

1927 births
2017 deaths
Footballers from Vienna
Austrian footballers
Austria international footballers
1954 FIFA World Cup players
1958 FIFA World Cup players
FK Austria Wien players
Austrian football managers
FK Austria Wien managers
Austria national football team managers
German military personnel of World War II
Association football defenders